El Porvenir Sur Airport  is an airport serving the El Porvenir Sur gas pipeline facility in the Chuquisaca Department of Bolivia.

The El Porvenir non-directional beacon (Ident: PVR) is located on the field.

See also

Transport in Bolivia
List of airports in Bolivia

References

External links 
OpenStreetMap - El Porvenir
OurAirports - El Porvenir
Fallingrain - El Porvenir Airport

Airports in Chuquisaca Department